Juliana Sayumi Terao (born 1991) is a Brazilian chess player. She received the FIDE titles of FIDE Master (FM) in 2017 and Woman International Master (WIM) in 2012. From 2014 until 2020 she was ranked as the best female chess player in Brazil. Her highest rating was 2311, achieved in March 2017.

She is six times Brazilian women's champion, a title she won in five consecutive years from 2015 to 2019.

Chess career

She has represented Brazil in the Chess Olympiad:
 In 2008, scoring 6/10 on board one.
 In 2010, scoring 5/11 on board one.
 In 2012, scoring 6½/10 on board two.
 In 2014, scoring 6/10 on board two.
 In 2016, scoring 7/11 on board one.
 In 2018, scoring 6/11 on board one.
 In 2022, scoring 7½/10 on board three.

See also
 List of female chess players

References

External links
 
 

1991 births
Living people
Brazilian female chess players
Chess Woman International Masters
Chess FIDE Masters